John William Matthew Davies (18 June 1900 – 18 June 1967) was an Australian rules footballer who played with Carlton and Fitzroy in the Victorian Football League (VFL).

Family
The son of John William Davies (1868–1948), and Christina Davies (1871–1952), née Knott, John William Matthew Davies was born at Brunswick, Victoria on 18 June 1900.

He married Elsie May England (1901–1971) in 1925.

Football
He was cleared from the Carlton Football Club to the "Carlton Seconds" in 1924.

Death
He died at Parkville, Victoria on 18 June 1967.

Notes

References
 
 Another Scotch VFL/AFL Football Player, Great Scot, (September 2014).

External links 

Johnny Davies's profile at Blueseum

1900 births
1967 deaths
People educated at Scotch College, Melbourne
Australian rules footballers from Melbourne
Carlton Football Club players
Fitzroy Football Club players
People from Brunswick, Victoria